Nafrathu is a 1994 Maldivian drama film directed by Abdulla Shujau. Produced by Hussain Rasheed under Farivaa Films, the film stars Aishath Shiranee, Nafiu Ali, Nooma Ibrahim, Ali Shameel and Arifa Ibrahim in pivotal roles.

Cast 
 Aishath Shiranee as Fazna
 Nafiu Ali as Nashidh
 Nooma Ibrahim as Shaira
 Ali Shameel as Nahidh
 Arifa Ibrahim as Aneesa; Shaira's mother
 Ibrahim Shakir as Moosafulhu; Nashidh's father
 Aminath Ibrahim Didi as Faahthaanike; Nashidh's mother
 Hamid Wajeeh
 Fathimath Shadhiya
 Adam Unais Zaki
 Hawwa Ennie as young Fazna
 Hassan Niyaz
 Hassan Ifham

Soundtrack

See also
 Lists of Maldivian films

References

1994 films
1994 drama films
Maldivian drama films
Dhivehi-language films